Robinia hispida, known as the bristly locust, rose-acacia, or moss locust, is a shrub in the subfamily Faboideae of the pea family Fabaceae. It is native to the southeastern United States, and it is present in other areas, including other regions of North America, as an introduced species. It is grown as an ornamental and can escape cultivation and grow in the wild.

Description
This deciduous shrub grows to 3 meters tall, often with glandular, bristly (hispid) stems. The leaves are pinnate with up to 13 leaflets. The pink or purplish pealike flowers are borne in hanging racemes of up to 5. The fruit is a flat pod.

Ethnobotany
The Cherokee had several uses for the plant. They used the root medicinally for toothache. They fed an infusion of the plant to cows as a tonic. The wood was useful for making fences, bows, and blowgun darts, and for building houses.

Subtaxa
There are at least 5 varieties:
Robinia hispida var. fertilis - Arnot bristly locust (North Carolina, Tennessee)
Robinia hispida var. hispida - Common bristly locust (Originally endemic to the Southern Appalachian Mountains but now escaped from cultivation throughout much of eastern North America)
Robinia hispida var. kelseyi - Kelsey's locust (North Carolina, sometimes considered to have arisen as a horticultural variety, sometimes considered a distinct species)
Robinia hispida var. nana - Dwarf bristly locust (Found in the Piedmont and Coastal Plain from North Carolina south to Alabama, typically in dry, sandy soils such as those in the Sandhills region; sometimes considered a distinct species as R. nana)
Robinia hispida var. rosea - Boynton's locust (North Carolina, Tennessee, South Carolina, Georgia, Alabama)

References

Robinieae